Flüelen railway station is a railway station in the Swiss canton of Uri and municipality of Flüelen. It is located on the Gotthard railway. The station is situated between the parallel Axenstrasse, the main road through Flüelen, and Bahnhofstrasse, with the main station buildings on Bahnhofstrasse.

Flüelen pier, on Lake Lucerne, lies on the opposite side of Bahnhofstrasse, allowing connections between trains and the boat services provided by the Schifffahrtsgesellschaft des Vierwaldstättersees (Lake Lucerne Navigation Company; SGV). This interchange forms a key part of the Gotthard Panorama Express, a tourist oriented combined paddle steamer and rail service that connects Lucerne and Locarno.

Buses operated by PostBus Switzerland serve a stop in front of the station in Bahnhofstrasse. Local buses operated by Auto AG Uri serve a stop on Axenstrasse, accessible from the station subway.

The station building is included in the Swiss Inventory of Cultural Property of National Significance. Between 1906 and 1951, the station was also the terminus of the Altdorf–Flüelen tramway, a metre gauge tramway.

Services
 the following services stop at Flüelen:

 Gotthard Panorama Express: daily tourist oriented service via the original high level Gotthard tunnel, with connecting boat service on Lake Lucerne to Lucerne.

References

External links 
 
 

Railway stations in the canton of Uri
Swiss Federal Railways stations